Robert Daseler (born 1945) is an American playwright, and poet.

He graduated from Pomona College in 1967.
He was director of public affairs for Claremont McKenna College, and director of communication at the Office of the State Librarian.

His work has appeared in the Formalist, The London Magazine,

Awards
1998 Richard Wilbur Award
Writers' Digest runner-up

Works
"First Site", ART
Shades of California: The Hidden Beauty of Ordinary Life 2001
Levering Avenue: Poems  University of Evansville Press, 1998, 
"Introduction", Shades of California: the hidden beauty of ordinary life : California's family album, Editor Kimi Kodani Hill, Heyday Books, 2001,

Plays
Alekhine's Defense, South Coast Repertory (world premiere) 1990 
Plays from South Coast Repertory, Volume 1, Broadway Play Publishing, 1993, 
 Dragon lady : a play in two acts. 1989

References

External links

American male poets
1945 births
Pomona College alumni
Living people
20th-century American dramatists and playwrights
American male dramatists and playwrights
20th-century American male writers